Rozbrat is a long-running anarchist self-managed social centre in Jeżyce in Poznań, Poland.

Occupation
Rozbrat is based in a former paint factory squatted in autumn 1994. The name means 'to make peace and get detached from an enemy.'

Activities
Rozbrat hosts many events and discussions. Different groups use the space such as a bicycle workshop, silk screen printers, anarchist library and infoshop, a gallery, the Breaking (Ear)drums samba band and Food not Bombs. The local branch of the Polish Anarchist Federation (Federacja Anarchistyczna) is based at Rozbrat since 1997.

The centre's longevity means that it is well supported in Poznań, although its future remains precarious.

Antifascist
Rozbrat joined with groups including Stonewall and Poznań Free from Hate to protest when  Robert Winnicki, member of the Polish Parliament and then-chairman of the far-right All-Poland Youth organization wanted to speak in Poznan in 2017.

Rozbrat has experienced two serious neo-Nazi attacks in 1996 and 2013. The perpetrators of the first attack received jail sentences after seriously wounding a sleeping person.

Related Initiatives

 Trade Union Workers' Initiative (Inicjatywa Pracownicza)
 WSL Wielkopolska Tenants' Association - member of European Action Coalition to the right to housing and to the city
 Anarchist bookstore Zemsta opened as an offshoot of Rozbrat in central Poznań.

References

1994 establishments in Poland
Anarchism in Poland
Infoshops
Squats